Dijon Football Côte d'Or (commonly referred to as Dijon FCO or simply Dijon) is a French women's football club based in the city of Dijon. It has been the women's section of Dijon FCO since 2006. The club currently plays in the Division 1 Féminine, the highest division of women's football in France.

Players

Current squad

Former players

References

External links
 

Women's football clubs in France
Division 1 Féminine clubs
Dijon FCO
Football clubs in Bourgogne-Franche-Comté
Sport in Dijon
Association football clubs established in 2006
2006 establishments in France